Hans Zhang Han (born 6 October 1983) is a Chinese actor, singer and host. He graduated from Central Academy of Drama in 2007. Zhang is best known for his roles in Meteor Shower (2009) and Meteor Shower II (2010), Fall in Love (2011), The Queen of SOP (2012), Heroes in Sui and Tang Dynasties (2013), Boss & Me (2014), The Four (2015), Wolf Warriors 2 (2017) and Here to Heart (2018).

Early life
Zhang Han was born in Qiqihar, Heilongjiang. He entered the Central Academy of Drama and majored in acting in 2003. At the start of his life, his prudishness led him to doubt his potential to be an actor. Zhang lingered around Beijing railway station to make a short video. He shot his video as a romantic love story, which sprung from the story of a ragged man. As a result of the video, Zhang was rewarded and was determined to stick with acting.

Career

2009–2011: Beginnings and Rising popularity
Zhang graduated from Central Academy of Drama in 2007. He rose to fame for his role as Murong Yunhai in the popular Chinese romance comedy drama Meteor Shower (2009) and its sequel, Meteor Shower II (2010).

In 2010, he starred in the Korean-Chinese animal film Hearty Paws 2 alongside Song Joong-ki.

In 2011, Zhang hosted Hunan TV's variety program Great Sunday with Meteor Shower co-stars Peer Zhu and Vision Wei. The same year he starred in the romance drama Fall in Love, a remake of the South Korean television series Autumn in My Heart. He then reunited with Meteor Shower co-star in the action film No Limit; both also played a couple in the historical television series Phoenix Totem.

2012–2016: Continued success
In 2012, Zhang starred in the romantic comedy drama The Queen of SOP alongside Joe Chen. It achieved high ratings throughout its run, leading to increased recognition for Zhang. He was recognized as the Most Influential Actor at the Asian Idol Awards, and was coined Mainland's "No.1 Idol Actor" for his successful work in idol dramas.

In 2013, Zhang starred in historical drama Heroes in Sui and Tang Dynasties. which was met with high ratings and positive reviews from critics. Zhang won the Most Popular Actor award at the 19th Shanghai Television Festival. The same year, he starred in the romance television series The Colors of Youth, where he portrayed 11 different personalities in one character.

In 2014, Zhang joined the travel reality program Divas Hit the Road. The series was a hit with the audience and continuously topped television ratings and popularity ranking throughout its run. He then starred alongside Zhao Liying in the romantic comedy drama Boss & Me, based on Gu Man's popular novel Come and Eat, Shan Shan. Boss & Me was a huge hit both domestically and overseas. Zhang won the Asian Star award at the Seoul International Drama Awards.

In a departure from his usual sunny roles, Zhang played 'Cold Blood' in the wuxia drama The Four (2015), based on the novel Si Da Ming Pu by Wen Ruian. The same year, he was also cast in the film adaptation of popular science fiction novel The Three Body Problem.

Following the establishment of his studio in 2015, Zhang announced that he would be taking part in the production of two upcoming dramas, The Rhapsody of a Summer Dream and If Paris Downcast.

In 2016, Zhang starred in the television adaptation of the Chinese mythical novel, Classic of Mountains and Seas. He was nominated for the Best Actor award at the Huading Awards. The same year, he starred in the crime thriller Ten Deadly Sins, based on the novel of the same name.

2017–present: Acclaim
In 2017, Zhang co-starred in Wu Jing's action film Wolf Warriors 2. He received praise for his role as a factory heir and army fanatic. He then starred in the revolutionary drama film Eternal Wave alongside Aaron Kwok and Zhao Liying. The same year, Zhang played Run Run Shaw in the drama The Legendary Tycoon, which narrates the life of the tycoon.

In 2018, Zhang starred with an alongside Janine Chang in romance drama Here to Heart. His performance earned him a Best Actor nomination at the Asian Television Awards.

In 2022, a Chinese TV series "Gentlemen of East 8th" was released with Hans Zhang as the producer, screenwriter and star.

Dispute 
The TV series "Gentlemen of East 8th" has caused controversy because of its greasy machismo lines, disrespect for women, and sexual harassment scenes.

The drama received a score as low as 2.1/10 on Douban, making it the lowest-rated film and television drama in Douban history.

As of 2022.09.26, all video platforms have removed the entire film from the show.

Personal life
Zhang previously dated actress Zheng Shuang. The two confirmed the break-up of the five-year relationship in September 2014.

In early 2015, he dated actress Guli Nazha and the two broke up after 3 years in October 2017.

Filmography

Film

Television series

Variety show

Discography

Awards and nominations

Notes and references

External links

Zhang Han's Instagram 
 https://instagram.com/zhanghann1006?igshid=1x2jdiod9rehm

Zhang Han's Sina Weibo
 https://weibo.com/u/1517934944

21st-century Chinese male actors
Male actors from Heilongjiang
Living people
1984 births
Central Academy of Drama alumni
People from Qiqihar
Chinese television presenters
Chinese male stage actors
Singers from Heilongjiang
Chinese male film actors
Chinese male television actors
Participants in Chinese reality television series
21st-century Chinese male singers